The Olanul is a right tributary of the river Cerna in Romania. It discharges into the Cerna near Cerna-Sat. Its source is in the Godeanu Mountains.

References

Rivers of Romania
Rivers of Gorj County